The Tarrant County Hospital District (TCHD) does business as the JPS Health Network. It is the taxpayer-supported hospital district of Tarrant County, Texas. Its headquarters are in the John Peter Smith Hospital at 1500 South Main Street, Fort Worth, Texas, 76104.

About JPS Health Network 

The origins of JPS Health Network go back to October 1877. Future Fort Worth mayor John Peter Smith deeded five acres of land for medical facilities for families in Fort Worth and in Tarrant County. JPS is a teaching facility. It is the site of the nation's largest hospital-based Family Medicine residency program.

JPS Health Network operates John Peter Smith Hospital, which is a 573-bed acute care facility in Fort Worth, Texas.

John Peter Smith Hospital provides emergency services and trauma care. The hospital is the only Level 1 Trauma Center in Tarrant County and the only psychiatric emergency services site in Tarrant County. More than 5,000 babies are born each year at John Peter Smith Hospital.

JPS is a certified Chest Pain Center, Certified Primary Stroke Center and an Accredited American College of Surgery Cancer Center. Joint Commission Disease Specific Certification in Sepsis and Geriatrics.  JPS has a Level lll Neonatal Intensive Care Center (NICU).

Academics 

JPS is a teaching site and trains physicians, nurses, physician assistants and other health care workers. JPS supports nine residency programs. The Family Medicine residency is the largest hospital-based family medicine residency program in the nation.

Leadership 

The JPS Board of Managers includes 11 members. They are appointed by the Tarrant County Commissioners. This committee manages the JPS Health Network facilities and leadership.

Health centers

The network includes more than 40 community-based health centers, including 20 clinics based on school campuses.

0% edit

See also

 Harris Health System (former Harris County Hospital District)
 Parkland Health & Hospital System (Dallas County)

References

External links
 JPS Health Network

Healthcare in Texas
Hospital networks in the United States
Tarrant County, Texas
Organizations based in Fort Worth, Texas
Buildings and structures in Tarrant County, Texas
Medical and health organizations based in Texas
Health departments in Texas